"Goodbye" is the second episode of the sixth season of the American television medical drama Grey's Anatomy, and the show's 104th episode overall. It was written by Krista Vernoff and directed by Bill D'Elia. The episode was originally broadcast on the American Broadcasting Company (ABC) in the United States on September 24, 2009. In "Goodbye",  the staff at Seattle Grace Hospital come to terms with the death of their colleague Dr. George O'Malley (T.R. Knight). Further storylines include Dr. Richard Webber (James Pickens, Jr.) being engaged in a vehicular collision, Dr. Callie Torres (Sara Ramirez) receiving a job as an attending physician at a neighboring hospital, and Dr. Alex Karev's (Justin Chambers) marriage with Dr. Izzie Stevens (Katherine Heigl) taking a toll after her near-death experience.

The episode was the second part of the 2-hour season 6 premiere special, the first being "Good Mourning", and was filmed in Los Angeles, California. The special was the first premiere that Knight did not appear in, following an early release from his contract, and Jessica Capshaw (Dr. Arizona Robbins)' first premiere in which she received star-billing, having been upgraded from a recurring-star from season 5. Shannon Lucio reprised her role as a guest star, in addition to Amy Madigan, Martha Plimpton, Zack Shada, Mitch Pileggi, and Zoe Boyle. "Goodbye" opened to positive critical reviews, with Chyler Leigh's (Dr. Lexie Grey) and Ramirez's performances receiving particular praise. The episode's original broadcast ranked it at #1 for the night having been viewed by 17.03 million Americans, with a 6.7/17 Nielsen rating/share in the 18–49 demographic.

Plot
In the episode, Dr. Cristina Yang (Sandra Oh) and Dr. Owen Hunt (Kevin McKidd) are undergoing couples therapy with the hospital's psychiatrist, Dr. Wyatt (Amy Madigan). The two are instructed not to engage in sexual activity, until their emotional deficits are healed, which they find uneasy to accomplish. Clara Ferguson (Zoe Boyle) is no longer depressed, and urges Dr. Lexie Grey (Chyler Leigh), who has given her attentive care, to return home.

Ferguson's depression returns again, when Dr. Miranda Bailey (Chandra Wilson) informs her that she has an infection that requires surgery. She rejects the surgery, and is further disappointed when Dr. Cristina Yang (Sandra Oh) tells her that the worst-case scenario is that she will need an ostomy pouching system. Dr. Arizona Robbins (Jessica Capshaw)'s chronic pain patient, Andy Michaelson (Zack Shada) and his mother Pam (Martha Plimpton) enter the emergency room, so Robbins and resident Dr. Alex Karev (Justin Chambers) order a 3D MRI, which is denied by the chief of surgery Dr. Richard Webber (James Pickens, Jr.).

On his way to a meeting, Webber goes through a red light, and collides with another vehicle, resulting in him becoming T-boned. Webber is taken to the neighboring Mercy West Hospital, where he is treated by former colleague Dr. Callie Torres (Sara Ramirez), and subsequently discharged. Ferguson finally agrees to the surgery, after constant pleads from Lexie, and makes a start to physical therapy. Lexie returns home to see her sister Dr. Meredith Grey (Ellen Pompeo) and her new husband Dr. Derek Shepherd (Patrick Dempsey) having sex in the kitchen. Dr. Izzie Stevens (Katherine Heigl) is at home, begging her husband Karev to spend time with her, but he dismisses her. At Dr. Mark Sloan (Eric Dane)'s apartment, his girlfriend Lexie has moved in, and his bisexual ex-girlfriend Torres walks in on Sloan in the shower. Lexie expresses her concern to Torres about doing this, and she apologizes. Robbins confronts Shepherd, the hospital's chief of neurosurgery, and asks him to run an expensive test to see if Andy has Tethered spinal cord syndrome, which reveals that he has it, and it is reversed through surgery. Stevens notices the girl Dr. George O'Malley (T.R. Knight) saved, Amanda (Shannon Lucio), sitting outside the hospital, and tells her to go get a life, because O'Malley did not save her so she could be miserable. At the conclusion of the episode, Stevens unites with Karev, and Webber announces that Seattle Grace will be merging with Mercy West.

Production

"Goodbye" was written by Krista Vernoff and directed by Bill D'Elia. Joe Mitacek edited the episode and Donald Lee Harris served as production designer. Featured music includes Fanfarlo's "Ghosts", Katie Herzig's "Hologram", Lucy Schwartz's "Gravity", and Emilíana Torrini's "Today Has Been OK". "Today Has Been OK" played while Shepherd (Dempsey) was consoling Bailey (Wilson) about O'Malley's (Knight) death, in the elevator. This song was originally played in the season 2 episode "Into You Like a Train", when Bailey was consoling Shepherd. This is the only time the series has reused a song. "Goodbye" is the second hour of the season 6 premiere. It was the first premiere not to feature Knight's character, O'Malley. Knight was released from his contract at the conclusion of season five, following a disagreement with series creator Shonda Rhimes over lack of screen-time for his character. When asked to make a 'flashback' appearance in season 6, Knight declined.

The scene in which Yang (Oh) and Hunt (McKidd) were partaking in couples therapy, was originally planned to be a comical moment. Vernoff commented on this: "I handed them that scene 20 MINUTES BEFORE CAMERAS ROLLED. It was actually a funny scene right up until the last minute. Sandra and Kevin had smart questions – and what became crystal clear to me instantly is that this storyline could not be resolved in a humorous way. It had earned weight. Indeed, it required weight." In the episode, Meredith (Pompeo) grieves her pain through constant sex with Shepherd. Vernoff explained she loves the fact that Meredith is healthy enough to realize what she is doing. At the conclusion of "Goodbye", Yang finally came to terms with the death of O'Malley. Vernoff offered her insight:

Reception

Broadcasting 
"Goodbye" was originally broadcast on September 24, 2009, on the American Broadcasting Company (ABC) in the United States, following the first part of the season 6 premiere "Good Mourning". It was viewed by a total of 17.04 million Americans, across its 2-hour 9:00 Eastern time-slot. The episode was the series' second least-viewed season premiere, up to that point, just ahead of the season 1 premiere—"A Hard Day's Night". In comparison to the previous episode, "Goodbye" made a 0.08% decrease in terms of viewership. However, the episode's viewership ranked first in both its time-slot and the entire night, beating out CBS's CSI. In addition to being a success in viewership, the episode also did well in ratings. "Goodbye"'s 6.7/17 Nielsen rating ranked first in its time-slot and the entire night, for both the rating and share percentages of the 18–49 demographic. The episode also received a rating of 10.9/18 in the 18-34 demographic, beating out CBS's The Mentalist, and ranking #1 in the ratings and shares for the demographic.

Critical Reception 

The episode opened to positive feedback from critics, and aired back-to-back with "Good Mourning", as a two-hour season premiere special. Alan Sepinwall of NJ.com commented on the 2 episodes being conjoined into 1 week: "I keep going back and forth on whether it was a good idea to do that, or if we'd have been better off spacing out the tearful speeches over 2 weeks. That isn't to say that there shouldn't have been tears, or speeches. George's death, no matter how marginal he had become last season, is and should be a huge event in the lives of these characters. Had the show raced through Elizabeth Kubler-Ross's famous 5 stages of grief, it would have rang false, as if everyone making the show was in a hurry to move past the events of the wildly-uneven fifth season. My problem is, when you put 2 episodes back-to-back, those rhythms - the pace at which the acts build to emotional crescendos and then briefly recede - start to become too predictable, and it sucks some of the life and emotion away." Sepinwall also praised Wilson's, Ramirez's, and Chambers' performances.

The Huffington Post Michael Pascua praised Dempsey's character, in comparison to his performance in "Good Mourning", writing: "Derek was set up as a real character in the second half, not just a one-sided McDreamy. First, Arizona and Derek finally fix the problem with Andy, then the two had some genuine interaction. Derek confronted Alex about his problems with Izzie. He took a moment to talk to Mark about the hospital's situation and ended the episode by confronting a very edgy Bailey. Miraculously, he had the time to have a lot of sex with Meredith." Pascua also enjoyed Leigh's performance, commenting: "Lexie continued to evolve. I loved the anxiety that Lexie had with Callie. She wasn't really a doctor in any sense in this episode, just a friend to lean on." Though he was impressed with the majority of the episode, Pascua had mixed feelings on the character of Stevens, attributing it to his dislike of Heigl.

References

External links
"Goodbye" at ABC.com

2009 American television episodes
Grey's Anatomy (season 6) episodes